Zevenhuizen is a common name for places in the Netherlands, meaning seven houses.

Hamlets 
Zevenhuizen, Bunschoten, hamlet in Bunschoten, Utrecht
Zevenhuizen, Eemsmond, hamlet in Eemsmond, Groningen
Zevenhuizen, Franekeradeel, hamlet in Franekeradeel, Friesland
Zevenhuizen, Heeze-Leende, hamlet in Heeze-Leende, North Brabant
Zevenhuizen, Kaag en Braassem, hamlet in Kaag en Braassem, South Holland
Zevenhuizen, Kollumerland en Nieuwkruisland, hamlet in Kollumerland en Nieuwkruisland, Friesland
Zevenhuizen, Maasdriel, hamlet in Maasdriel, Gelderland
Zevenhuizen, Moerdijk, hamlet in Moerdijk, North Brabant
Zevenhuizen, Ten Boer (Zevenhuisjes), hamlet in Ten Boer, Groningen
Zevenhuizen, Texel, hamlet in Texel, North Holland
Zevenhuizen, Tytsjerksteradiel, hamlet in Tytsjerksteradiel, Friesland
Zevenhuizen, Werkendam, hamlet in Werkendam, North Brabant

Street
Zevenhuizen, Heiloo, village in Heiloo, North Holland

Quarters 
Zevenhuizen, Apeldoorn, quarter in Apeldoorn, Gelderland

Villages 
Zevenhuizen, Leek, village in Leek, Groningen
Zevenhuizen, Zuidplas, village in Zuidplas, South Holland